Benjamin Huberman (1938-) is an American science advisor who formerly served as the acting director of the Office of Science and Technology Policy and acting Science Advisor to the President under President Ronald Reagan.

Biography 
Huberman was born in Cuba in 1938.  He received his A.B. and B.S. degrees from Columbia University in 1959 and 1960, respectively, as well as a diploma from Imperial College London, which he attended as a Fulbright scholar.

Huberman served on the U.S. National Security Council as Deputy Director for Program Analysis under President Jimmy Carter. He was also the Director of Policy and Evaluation for the Nuclear Regulatory Commission from 1975 to 1977, where he was credited for designing the seal of the commission in early 1975. 

In 1978, he accompanied Zbigniew Brzezinski on his first trip to China.

Huberman served as the Deputy Director of the Office of Science and Technology Policy from 1978 to 1981 and Deputy Science Advisor to Ronald Reagan in 1981. He was appointed acting director of OSTP on March 5, 1981.

References 

1938 births
Alumni of Imperial College London
Columbia College (New York) alumni
Columbia School of Engineering and Applied Science alumni
Living people
Office of Science and Technology Policy officials
United States National Security Council staffers
Directors of the Office of Science and Technology Policy